Vinodarayunipalem is a village in the Prakasam District of Andhra Pradesh state in India. The village is the birthplace of Tanguturi Prakasam, the first chief minister of the former Andhra State.

The village is very near to the Bay of Bengal through the Kanaparthi seashore point.

References

Villages in Prakasam district